The Pit is the debut novel by Uruguayan author Juan Carlos Onetti.

Published in 1939, the novel is written in form of a diary. Eladio Linacero, the main character, shows his scepticism for life in general.

Some literary critics trace the origins of the Latin American Boom to this novel and others, such as Ernesto Sábato's El Túnel.

References

1939 novels
1939 debut novels
Uruguayan novels
Existentialist novels